Mireille (minor planet designation: 594 Mireille) is a minor planet orbiting the Sun.

References

External links
 
 

Background asteroids
Mireille
19060327
Mireille